Nassaria fibula is a species of sea snail, a marine gastropod mollusk in the family Nassariidae, the true whelks.

Description
The length of the shell attains 24.8 mm.

Distribution
This marine species occurs in the East China Sea.

References

 Fraussen K. & Stahlschmidt P. (2008). A new Nassaria (Gastropoda: Buccinidae) from the East China Sea. Miscellanea Malacologica, 3(3): 33-37

External links

Nassariidae
Gastropods described in 2008